Abd al-Baqi Yazdi, was a Persian nobleman, who was the third person to serve as the vakil (vicegerent) of the Safavid Empire.

Biography 
A native of Yazd, Abd al-Baqi was the son of Na'im-al-Din Nematollah Sani, who was descended from Shah Nematollah, the founder of the Nematollahi order. In the early 16th-century, Abd al-Baqi succeeded his father as the leader of the Nematollah order. Later in 1511, Abd al-Baqi took part in a celebration at the camp of the Safavid ruler Ismail I (r. 1501–1524).

One year later, Abd al-Baqi served under the vakil Najm-e Sani, who was after a few months killed in Khorasan by Uzbeks. Abd al-Baqi was then appointed as the new vakil by Ismail I. Abd al-Baqi participated in the Battle of Chaldiran in 1514, where the Safavids, however, were defeated and Abd al-Baqi himself was killed. Another Iranian, Mirza Shah Hossein, was then appointed as the new vakil after having found Ismail's favorite wife, who was lost after the battle.

Abd al-Baqi had a son named Mir Abd al-Baqi Yazdi (d. 1564), who was appointed as the governor of Yazd when Ismail's son Tahmasp I ascended the Safavid throne in 1524. He also later in 1535/6 married one of Tahmasp's sisters, who bore him an unnamed daughter, who later married Tahmasp's son Ismail II.

References

Sources 
 
 
 
 
 

Safavid generals
16th-century Iranian military personnel
1514 deaths
15th-century births
Military personnel killed in action
People from Yazd
Vakils of Safavid Iran
16th-century people of Safavid Iran